Georgia's Ordinance of Secession was adopted at the Georgia Secession Convention of 1861. It was put to the vote on January 19, 1861; concluding at 2:00 P.M. (the vote was 208 in favor of immediate secession with 89 opposed). Prior to signing the ordinance, Eugenius A. Nisbet tabled a motion suggesting that the ordinance should be signed by all of the convention's delegates, irrespective of their vote – as a pledge of support and to signal a unified purpose. Nisbet's motion passed, and at 12 o'clock M., Convention President, George W. Crawford, announced that the hour had arrived for signing the Ordinance of Secession.

Crawford signed the ordinance; becoming its first signatory, and then he instructed Secretary Lamar to "call the delegates forward, by county, to sign the ordinance." Some delegates withheld signing; with six delegates insisting that a protest be incorporated into the ordinance. The list below shows the delegate's name, (as it was recorded on the convention's roster), the county which they represent, whether they had signed the ordinance or not, and how they had voted when the ordinance passed.

References

Secession crisis of 1860–61
History of Georgia (U.S. state)